Štúrovo–Čata–Levice railway is a railway line in Southern Slovakia. It runs from North to South more or less parallel with Hron. It is a single track without electrification.

To the end of WWI 
It was built by a subsidiary of MÁV, called Garam-Ipolyvölgyi MÁV-HÉV. It had a connection at Párkány to the Budapest–Érsekújvár–Pozsony–Marchegg-railway. First, 20 km long part of it between Párkány and Csata was opened on 1 June 1885. Second part between Csata and Léva was opened on 18 September 1887. As a consequence of the Treaty of Trianon, the line was transferred to the newly founded Czechoslovakia.

Station on the line

Eyternal links 

 
 

Railway lines in Slovakia
Railway lines opened in 1885